Corrado Tartarini (died 1602) was an Italian Roman Catholic prelate who served as Bishop of Forlì (1599–1602) and Apostolic Nuncio to Savoy (1601–1602).

Biography
Corrado Tartarini was born in Città di Castello, Italy.
On 18 Sep 1599, he was appointed during the papacy of Pope Clement VIII as Bishop of Forlì.
On 2 Aug 1601, he was appointed during the papacy of Pope Clement VIII as Apostolic Nuncio to Savoy.
He served as Bishop of Forlì and Apostolic Nuncio to Savoy until his death on 13 Feb 1602.

References

External links 
 (for Chronology of Bishops) 
 (for Chronology of Bishops)  
 (for Chronology of Bishops) 

16th-century Italian Roman Catholic bishops
17th-century Italian Roman Catholic bishops
Bishops appointed by Pope Clement VIII
1602 deaths
Apostolic Nuncios to Savoy
Bishops of Forlì